Theodore Bogdanovitch GC (1 April 1900 – 20 April 1956) was a recipient of the Empire Gallantry Medal later converted into the George Cross for his actions in 1939 during the Arab revolt in Palestine.

Born in Strumica (nowadays located in Macedonia), he served with the Serbian Army in World War I where he was wounded. He joined with British forces as part of the Serbian Guard and later joined the Palestine Gendarmerie. After the force was split, he joined the Transjordan Frontier Force. In June 1939 he was awarded the Empire Gallantry Medal (Military Division) for his actions in an Arab revolt in 1939. The full citation states:

Bogdanovitch's Empire Gallantry Medal was exchanged for the George Cross after that award was instituted in September 1940. 

He became a naturalized British citizen in October 1944, and retired from the Transjordan Frontier Force in 1947. He then moved to Cyprus where he took a security job in a mining company. On 20 April 1956, during the Cyprus Emergency, he was shot dead by EOKA gunmen.

After his death, Bogdanovitch's medals – including the George Cross– were donated to the Gordon Highlanders Museum in Aberdeen by his executors, as he had been working closely with that regiment as part of his work duties at the time of his death.

References

  (Website: britains-smallwars.com)
  (Website: VConline.org.uk)

1900 births
1956 deaths
Deaths by firearm in Cyprus
Serbian military personnel of World War I
Recipients of the Empire Gallantry Medal
British people of the Cyprus Emergency
Naturalised citizens of the United Kingdom
British people murdered abroad
British terrorism victims
People killed in the Cyprus Emergency
Serbian emigrants to the United Kingdom
Royal Serbian Army soldiers